Jean Pyerre Casagrande Silveira Correa (born 7 May 1998), known as Jean Pyerre, is a former Brazilian footballer who played as an attacking midfielder.

Club career

Grêmio 
Jean Pyerre is a youth exponent from Grêmio. He made his league debut on 13 August 2017, against Botafogo in a 1–0 away loss. He replaced Lincoln after 82 minutes.

Loan to Giresunspor 
On 30 January 2022, Jean Pyerre was loaned to Süper Lig club Giresunspor. Shortly after passing medical examinations at his new club, it was identified that Pyerre had testicular cancer and he subsequently returned to Brazil.

Honors
Grêmio
Campeonato Gaúcho: 2019, 2020, 2021
Recopa Gaúcha: 2021

References

1998 births
Living people
Sportspeople from Rio Grande do Sul
Association football midfielders
Brazilian footballers
Campeonato Brasileiro Série A players
Grêmio Foot-Ball Porto Alegrense players
Avaí FC players